Metrioglypha ithuncus is a species of moth of the family Tortricidae first described by Józef Razowski in 2013. It is found on Seram Island in Indonesia. The habitat consists of secondary forests.

The wingspan is about 16 mm. The forewings are greyish, glossy in the basal area of the wing and tinged brownish in the dorsal part. The hindwings are dark brown with a greyish-white costal area.

Etymology
The specific name refers to the shape of the uncus and is derived from Greek ithys (meaning straight).

References

Moths described in 2013
Olethreutini